French Peruvians (French: français-péruvien; Spanish: franco-peruano) are Peruvian citizens of French ancestry, or those who immigrated to Peru from France. The French were the fourth largest group of immigrants to settle in the country after the Spanish, Italians, and the Germans.

History

In 1872, the Sociedad de Inmigración Europea ("European Immigration Society") was founded in Peru. Its objective was promoting Old World immigration by covering the costs of their journeys and financially supporting them during their first settler years in Peru.

The regions where most of the French immigrants originated from were Bordeaux, Paris, as well as the French portion of the Basque Country. They mostly interacted with fellow French immigrants, and they were usually relatively skilled at a trade. Initially the community was united, but as time passed many intermarried with Peruvians from other European backgrounds. Very few French-Peruvians can trace their ancestry.

Notable people

 Fernando Belaúnde Terry

 Ricardo Belmont Cassinelli
 Pedro Pablo Kuczynski
 Mariana Larrabure de Orbegoso
 Jean Pierre Magnet
 Verónika Mendoza
 Iván Thays
 Gianfranco Labarthe
 Madeleine Truel
 Alex Fort Brescia

French Peruvian institutions and associations

 Asociación Franco-Peruana
 Asociación Civil Franco-Peruano
 Colegio Franco-Peruano http://www.lfrancope.edu.pe
 Asociación Técnica Franco Peruana
 Asociacion de Decendientes Franceses en Peru
 Asociacion Cultural Franco-Peruano
 Colegio Sagrado Corazon (Arequipa) http://www.ssccaqp.edu.pe
 Colegio Saint Andre/san andrew https://web.archive.org/web/20120222160738/http://www.denperu.com/sandrew/
 Edu France https://web.archive.org/web/20100111011638/http://www.edufrance-peru.com/ 
 Colegio Lycee Jean Baptiste Lamarck (Arequipa)

See also

 France–Peru relations

References

Ethnic groups in Peru
European Peruvian
Peru
Peru